The Hanau-Würzburg/Fulda-Erfurt high-speed railway is a collection of railway expansion projects improving capacity and journey times from Frankfurt-am-Main via Hanau to the north and east of Germany.  

Its parts are as follows:
 expansion and new construction between Hanau and Nantenbach („Südkorridor“); completed
 four-track expansion of the existing Kinzig Valley Railway from Hanau to Gelnhausen; preparations underway, construction to start in 2025
 new high-speed line from Gelnhausen to Fulda; corridor selected and to be approved (Raumordungsverfahren)
 expansion and new construction from Fulda to Gerstungen
 the already completed expansion of the Thüringer Bahn between Gerstungen, Eisenach and Erfurt, which now allows speeds of 160 km/h, partially even 200 km/h.

References

High-speed rail in Germany
Rail infrastructure in Germany